The year 1705 in architecture involved some significant events.

Buildings and structures

Buildings

 March – The first of the principal buildings of Greenwich Hospital, London, the King Charles Court, designed by Christopher Wren, is completed.
 November – In Williamsburg, capital of the Virginia colony in America, construction of the first Capitol building is completed.
 Blenheim Palace is begun at Woodstock, Oxfordshire, England, designed by John Vanbrugh (completed 1722).
 The Stadtpalais Liechtenstein in Vienna, Austria, is completed (started 1692).
 Remodelling of the Jesuit Church, Vienna, by Andrea Pozzo is largely completed.

Births
 January 8 – Jacques-François Blondel, French architect (died 1774)
 Charles Labelye, Swiss civil engineer (died 1762)
 Approximate date – Richard Taliaferro, American architect working in Williamsburg, Virginia (died 1779)

Deaths
 Lady Elizabeth Wilbraham, English amateur architect (born 1632)

References

architecture
Years in architecture
18th-century architecture